Barnolt was the stage name of Paul Fleuret (14 June 1839 – 15 June 1900), a French operatic tenor associated with the Opéra-Comique in Paris.

Career
After a year of study at the Paris Conservatoire, where his teachers included Charles Bataille, Barnolt made his debut at the Folies-Marigny and further appearances at the Fantaisies-Parisiennes (1866) where he began to take on roles in the trial repertoire.

Barnolt made his debut at the Opéra-Comique on 23 July 1870 as Dandolo in Zampa and went on to become one of the "most useful and faithful servants of the Opéra-Comique". He sang Remendado in the premiere of Carmen and returned to sing this role at the Opéra-Comique revivals of 1883, 1891, and 1898. He was on-stage singing Fréderic in Thomas' Mignon the night of the fire at the Salle Favart on 25 May 1887.

At the Opéra-Comique he also sang the roles of Ali-bajou (Le Caïd), Lillas Pastia (Carmen), Dickson (La dame blanche), Bertrand (Le déserteur), Thibaut (Les dragons de Villars), Beppo (Fra Diavolo), Midas (Galathée), le Poète (Louise), Benetto (Le maître de chapelle), Fréderic (Mignon), Basilio (The Marriage of Figaro), Blaise (Le Nouveau Seigneur de village), Cantarelli (Le Pré aux clercs), Guillaume (Richard Coeur-de-lion), Scapin (La Serva Padrona), and Mouck (La statue).

His last recorded performances are in 1900, the year of his death.

Roles created
Among thirty Opéra-Comique premieres were:
Pacôme in Le roi l'a dit, 1873
Remendado in Carmen, 1875
Ridendo in Les Noces de Fernande, 1878
 Séraphin in Le Pain bis, 1879
Desfonandrès/1st médecin in L’amour médecin, 1880
Trivelin in Joli Gilles, 1884
Basile in Le roi malgré lui, 1887
Gil in Proserpine, 1887
Guillaume in La Basoche, 1890
Cynalopex in Phryné, 1893

Barnolt also sang in the Paris premieres of Werther (Schmidt) in 1893, Falstaff (Bardolphe) in 1894 and La bohème (Parpignol) 1898.

References

1839 births
1900 deaths
French operatic tenors
19th-century French male opera singers
Conservatoire de Paris alumni